The División Mayor del Fútbol Profesional Colombiano (Major Division of Colombian Professional Football), also known by the truncation DIMAYOR, is an organization responsible for organizing and operating professional football leagues and tournaments in Colombia. It administers the top two levels of professional football leagues in Colombia, the Primera A and the Primera B, as well as the Colombian Superliga and Copa Colombia, Colombia's domestic football cup.

References

External links
 Official website 
 Federación Colombiana de Fútbol's official website 

Association football governing bodies in South America
Sports organisations of Colombia